The Association of Tennis Professionals (ATP) World Tour is the elite professional tennis circuit organised by the ATP. The 2009 ATP World Tour calendar comprises the Grand Slam tournaments (supervised by the International Tennis Federation (ITF)), the ATP World Tour Masters 1000, the ATP World Tour 500 series, the ATP World Tour 250 series, the ATP World Team Championship, the Davis Cup (organized by the ITF), and the ATP World Tour Finals. Also included in the 2009 calendar is the Hopman Cup, which does not distribute ranking points, and is organised by the ITF.

2009 saw Pete Sampras' Grand Slam singles record surpassed by Roger Federer, who won his 15th title at Wimbledon. Federer also completed his Career Grand Slam at this year's French Open.

Tour changes
The ATP reinstated the world tour to its name as the organisation rebranded itself as the ATP World Tour. ATP World Tour tournaments in 2009 are classified as ATP World Tour Masters 1000, ATP World Tour 500, and ATP World Tour 250. Broadly speaking the Tennis Masters Series tournaments became the new Masters 1000 level and ATP International Series Gold and ATP International Series events became ATP 500 level and 250 level events.

The World Tour Masters 1000 includes tournaments at Indian Wells, Miami, Monte Carlo, Rome, Madrid, Toronto/Montreal, Cincinnati, Shanghai, and Paris. The end-of-year event, the Tour Finals, moved to London. Hamburg has been displaced by the new clay court event at Madrid, which is a new combined men's and women's tournament, and the indoor hard court event in Madrid was replaced by an outdoor hard court Masters tournament in Shanghai. From 2011, Rome and Cincinnati will also be combined tournaments. Severe sanctions will be placed on top players skipping the Masters 1000 series events, unless medical proof is presented. Plans to eliminate Monte Carlo and Hamburg as Masters Series events led to controversy and protests from players as well as organisers. Hamburg and Monte Carlo filed lawsuits against the ATP, and as a concession it was decided that Monte Carlo remains a Masters 1000 level event, with more prize money and 1000 ranking points, but it would no longer be a compulsory tournament for top-ranked players. Monte Carlo later dropped its suit. Hamburg was "reserved" to become a 500 level event in the summer. Hamburg did not accept this concession, but later lost its suit.

The World Tour 500 level includes tournaments at Rotterdam, Dubai, Acapulco, Memphis, Barcelona, Hamburg, Washington, Beijing, Tokyo, Basel, and Valencia.

The ATP & ITF declared that 2009 Davis Cup World Group and World Group Playoffs award a total of up to 500 points. Players accumulate points over the four rounds and the playoffs and these are counted as one of a player's four best results from the 500 level events. An additional 125 points are given to a player who wins all eight live rubbers and wins the Davis Cup.

Otherwise, the domain name of their website was changed to "www.atpworldtour.com".

Schedule
This is the complete schedule of events on the 2009 calendar, with player progression documented from the quarterfinals stage.

Key

January

February

March

April

May

June

July

August

September

October

November

Statistical information

These tables present the number of singles (S), doubles (D), and mixed doubles (X) titles won by each player and each nation during the season, within all the tournament categories of the 2009 ATP World Tour: the Grand Slam tournaments, the ATP World Tour Finals, the ATP World Tour Masters 1000, the ATP World Tour 500 series, and the ATP World Tour 250 series. The players/nations are sorted by: 1) total number of titles (a doubles title won by two players representing the same nation counts as only one win for the nation); 2) cumulated importance of those titles (one Grand Slam win equalling two Masters 1000 wins, one ATP World Tour Finals win equalling one-and-a-half Masters 1000 win, one Masters 1000 win equalling two 500 events wins, one 500 event win equalling two 250 events wins); 3) a singles > doubles > mixed doubles hierarchy; 4) alphabetical order (by family names for players).

Key

Titles won by player

Titles won by nation

Title information
The following players won their first main circuit title in singles, doubles, or mixed doubles:
Singles
 Rajeev Ram – Newport (singles)
 Guillermo García López – Kitzbühel (singles)
 Benjamin Becker – 's-Hertogenbosch (singles)
 Jérémy Chardy – Stuttgart (singles)
 Thomaz Bellucci – Gstaad (singles)

Doubles
 Marc López – Doha (doubles)
 Rajeev Ram – Chennai (doubles)
 Brian Dabul – Viña del Mar (doubles)
 Tommy Haas – San José (doubles)
 Marcel Granollers – Costa do Sauípe (doubles)
 Łukasz Kubot – Casablanca (doubles)
 Jan Hernych – Munich (doubles)
 Ivo Minář – Munich (doubles)
 Marco Chiudinelli – Gstaad (doubles)
 Michael Lammer – Gstaad (doubles)
 Colin Fleming – Metz (doubles)
 Ken Skupski – Metz (doubles)

Mixed Doubles
 Travis Parrott – US Open (mixed doubles)

The following players defended a main circuit title in singles, doubles, or mixed doubles:
 Fernando González – Viña del Mar (singles)
 Mark Knowles – Memphis (doubles)
 Rafael Nadal – Monte Carlo (singles), Barcelona (singles)
 Nicolás Almagro – Acapulco (singles)
 Michal Mertiňák – Acapulco (doubles), Umag (doubles)
 Bob Bryan – French Open (mixed doubles)
 Daniel Nestor – Wimbledon Championships (doubles)
 Nenad Zimonjić – Wimbledon Championships (doubles)
 Juan Martín del Potro – Washington (singles)
 Robert Lindstedt – Washington (doubles)
 Kevin Ullyett – Stockholm (doubles)

Rankings
These are the ATP rankings of the top twenty singles players, doubles players, and the top ten doubles teams on the ATP Tour, at the end of the 2008 ATP Tour, and of the 2009 season, with number of rankings points, number of tournaments played, year-end ranking in 2008, highest and lowest position during the season (for singles and doubles individual only, as doubles team rankings are not calculated over a rolling year-to-date system), and number of spots gained or lost from the 2008 to the 2009 year-end rankings. The 2008 year-end rankings include the number of points under the 2008 points system, and doubled, as they were at the end of the year by the ATP, to fit the 2009 points system (the doubles (team) rankings points were not doubled, as they were calculated under the ATP Race points system in 2008). The doubled year-end rankings were never officially published though, as the first rankings of 2009 already counted the drop of the 2008 season openers' points due to a calendar change.

Singles

Doubles (Individual)

Doubles

Prize money leaders
As of December 28, 2009

Statistics leaders
As of December 21, 2009. Source

Best 5 Matches by ATPWorldTour.com

Point distribution

(ATP World Tour Masters 1000) Qualifying points changes to 12 points only if the main draw is larger than 56
(ATP World Tour 500) Qualifying points changes to 10 points only if the main draw is larger than 32
(ATP World Tour 250) Qualifying points changes to 5 points only if the main draw is larger than 32

Retirements

Following is a list of notable players (winners of a main tour title, and/or part of the ATP rankings top 100 (singles) or top 50 (doubles) for at least one week) who announced their retirement from professional tennis during the 2009 season:

  Agustín Calleri (born September 14, 1976, in Río Cuarto, Argentina) started his pro career in 1995, reaching his best singles ranking, no. 16, in 2003. A clay court specialist, Calleri titled twice in singles and thrice in doubles during his time on the main tour, but never went further than the third round in any Grand Slam tournament. He played his last professional match in July on the ATP Challenger Tour in Bogotá.
  Guillermo Coria (born January 13, 1982, in Rufino, Argentina) joined the pro circuit in 2000, reaching his best singles ranking, no. 3, in 2004, and finishing three seasons within the top 10 (2003–2005). Junior French Open singles champion and Junior Wimbledon doubles champion in 1999, Coria collected nine singles titles on the main tour, among which two ATP Masters Series titles (Hamburg 2003 and Monte Carlo 2004). Two-time quarterfinalist at the US Open (2003, 2005), Coria lost the 2004 French Open final to countryman Gastón Gaudio, despite leading by two sets to love and later holding two match points in the final set. He played his last match in March at a Challenger event in Bangkok.
  Nicolas Coutelot (born February 9, 1977, in Strasbourg, France) became a professional in 1996, reaching his highest singles ranking, no. 87, in 2002. Coutelot mostly competed on the ATP Challenger Tour and the ITF Men's Circuit, where he played his last match in a Futures tournament in April.
  Werner Eschauer (born April 26, 1974, in Hollenstein an der Ybbs, Austria) turned professional in 1998, reaching his career-high singles ranking of no. 52 in 2007. Eschauer competed mainly on the ATP Challenger Tour and the ITF Men's Circuit during his career, playing his last match in a Futures tournament in November.
  Luis Horna (born September 14, 1980, in Lima, Peru) came on the tour in 1998, reaching career-high rankings of singles no. 33 in 2004 and doubles no. 16 in 2008. A French Open and Wimbledon Junior doubles champion, Horna took home two singles and six doubles titles on the main circuit, clinching his biggest win at the French Open (2008), which he won with Pablo Cuevas. Horna last competed at the Lima Challenger in November.

  Thomas Johansson (born March 25, 1975, in Linköping, Sweden) turned professional in 1993 and ranked as high as no. 7 in mid-2002, though he never finished a season in the top 10. Twice a quarterfinalist at the US Open (1998, 2000), once a semifinalist in Wimbledon (2005), Johansson won one Grand Slam title at the Australian Open (2002, def. Safin). Over his career, he collected eight more singles titles, one doubles title, and a silver medal in doubles at the 2008 Olympics. Johansson last competed in the Miami qualifying in March.
  Hyung-taik Lee (born January 3, 1976, in Hoengseong, South Korea) joined the tour in 1995, reaching a career-high ranking of no. 36 in 2007. Lee won one singles and one doubles titles on the main circuit, posting his best results on the ATP Challenger Tour where he last played in Seoul in October.
  Petr Pála (born October 2, 1975, in Prague, Czech Republic, then Czechoslovakia) turned professional in 1993, peaking at the no. 10 doubles spot in 2001. Pála collected seven doubles titles in his career, also finishing runner-up, alongside Pavel Vízner, at the 2001 French Open and the 2001 doubles championships. Pála played his last professional match in Gstaad in July.
  Andrei Pavel (born January 27, 1974, in Constanța, Romania) entered the circuit in 1995, reaching the no. 13 in singles in 2004, and in doubles in 2007. A French Open junior champion in 1992, Pavel collected three trophies in singles (including the 2001 Montreal Masters) and five in doubles during his career on the main tour. He last competed in singles and in doubles during the Bucharest tournament in September.
  Mariano Puerta (born September 19, 1978, in San Francisco, Argentina) turned pro in 1998, reaching a career-high singles ranking of no. 9 in 2005. He won three singles and one doubles titles on the main tour, and reached one Grand Slam final, at the French Open (2005, lost to Nadal). Puerta was sanctioned for doping offenses in 2003 (nine months) and 2005 (eight years, later reduced to two). He came back from suspension in 2007, competing until the Lima Challenger in November.
  Sergio Roitman (born May 16, 1979, in Buenos Aires, Argentina) became a pro player in 1996, peaking at no. 62 in singles in 2007, and no. 45 in doubles in 2008. Roitman titled twice in doubles on the main circuit, but most of his victories came on the ATP Challenger Tour, where he played his last match at the Guayaquil Challenger in November.
  Marat Safin (born January 27, 1980, in Moscow, Russia, then USSR) turned professional in 1997, and became the 18th man to lead the ATP rankings as world no. 1 on November 20, 2000, holding the position for nine weeks over three spells. Over his 12-year career, Safin collected 15 singles titles (including five ATP Masters Series shields in Toronto (2000), Madrid (2004) and Paris (2000, 2002, 2004)) and two doubles trophies. A semifinalist at the French Open (2002) and at Wimbledon (2008), Safin won two Grand Slam titles out of four finals, his first coming at the US Open (2000, def. Sampras), his second at the Australian Open (2005, def. Hewitt) after two runner-up finishes in Melbourne (2002, lost to Johansson, 2004, lost to Federer). Three time a Top Ten finisher at the end of the season (2000, 2002, 2004), Safin also contributed to the two first Davis Cup victories for Russia in 2002 and 2006. He retired during the BNP Paribas Masters in November, playing his last match against Juan Martín del Potro before a ceremony was held for him on center court.
  Jim Thomas (born September 24, 1974, in Canton, United States) turned professional in 1996, and peaked at no. 29 doubles ranking in 2006. Thomas won six doubles titles on the main circuit during his career, and last competed in June on the ATP Challenger Tour in Reggia Emilia.
  Alexander Waske (born May 31, 1975, in Frankfurt, Germany, then West Germany) joined the circuit in 2000, reaching career-high rankings of no. 89 in singles in 2006, and no. 16 in doubles in 2007. Waske won four doubles titles on the main tour, and played his last tournament at the French Open in May.
  Tomáš Zíb (born January 31, 1976, in Písek, Czech Republic, then Czechoslovakia) joined the circuit in 1995, and reached his best singles ranking, no. 51, in 2005. Also a top-100 player in doubles, Zíb won one doubles title in his career, playing his last tournament in Rome on the ATP Challenger Tour in April.

See also
2009 WTA Tour
2009 ATP Challenger Tour
2009 ITF Women's Circuit
Association of Tennis Professionals
International Tennis Federation

References
General

Specific

External links
Association of Tennis Professionals (ATP) World Tour official website
International Tennis Federation (ITF) official website

 
ATP World Tour
ATP Tour seasons